Hayley Turner  (born 3 January 1983) is an English jockey who competes in flat racing. Originally from Nottingham, she is based in Newmarket. 

In 2008 Turner became the first woman to ride 100 UK flat race winners during a calendar year. She went on to win eight Group races, including two Group 1 races and a Grade 1 race. She retired from racing in 2015 and became a regular contributor to ITV Racing. She came out of retirement in 2018 and since then has ridden three winners at Royal Ascot.

Background

Turner was born two miles from Nottingham Racecourse in north Nottinghamshire, one of six daughters of Kate and Richard Turner. Her mother was a riding instructor and she learnt to ride at an early age. She later rode out for local trainer Mark Polglase and attended a course at the Northern Racing College before becoming apprenticed to Michael Bell at Newmarket, Suffolk. Her first race ride was on Markellis at Southwell on 27 March 2000. Turner never finished the race; the horse broke a leg and was euthanised. Her first winning ride was her eighth, on Generate at Pontefract on 4 June 2000. Bell sent her to Tom Amoss, in New Orleans for three months of training. She also spent the winter of 2004 riding out for Godolphin in Dubai.

In 2005 Turner was joint Champion Apprentice with Saleem Golam with 44 winners. She rode her 95th winner in September of that year, thereby "riding out her claim", only the fourth woman to do so in Britain.

Racing career

In 2008 Turner became the first female jockey to ride 100 winners in a calendar year in Britain, when Mullitovermaurice won at Wolverhampton on 30 December 2008. That year also saw high-profile handicap wins on Furnace at Chester and Ascot and on The Betchworth Kid at Doncaster. She secured her first Group race winner on Lady Deauville in the Lando-Trophy in Germany on 16 November 2008. She was voted as Channel 4's Racing Personality for 2008.

In March 2009, Turner was badly injured in an accident on the Newmarket gallops. The head injury initially threatened to sideline her for the rest of the year, but fresh medical evidence allowed her to return to race-riding in mid-summer and she ended the year on 60 winners, her second highest figure. While unable to ride she made some guest appearances as a pundit on Channel 4 Racing.

The 2010 flat racing year continued to be successful for Turner; highlights included a first Group 1 ride on Barshiba in the Nassau Stakes at Glorious Goodwood, and winning the Group 2 Lancashire Oaks on the same horse at Haydock a month earlier; and a successful partnership with classy two-year-old Margot Did, which included two winners and second places in two Group 3 races and a Group 2.

In January 2011, Turner had her first race-rides at the Meydan racecourse in Dubai, as part of the annual Dubai Racing Carnival. In July 2011 Turner rode her first Group 1 winner, Dream Ahead, in the July Cup at Newmarket. and repeated the feat the following month winning the Group 1 Nunthorpe Stakes on Margot Did during York's Ebor Meeting. A few weeks later she broke her ankle in a fall at Bath. She received the 'Most Inspirational Sportswoman' Award at the 2011 Jaguar Academy of Sport Annual Awards.

2012 saw Turner ride 92 winners, her second-best season, at a strike rate of 12%, also a career second-best. On 31 May 2012 she became the first female jockey to ride on the Dubai World Cup night. She rode Margot Did in the Al Quoz Sprint where she finished well back in the field. On 2 June 2012 she became the second female jockey to ride in the Epsom Derby. She rode Cavaliero where she came last of the nine horses running. In August 2012, Turner won the Beverly D. Stakes in the United States riding the David Simcock trained I'm a Dreamer, becoming the first UK-based woman to ride an international Grade 1 winner.

In 2013 Turner was twice sidelined by injuries, breaking an ankle in July and then in September sustaining damage to her pelvis and three vertebrae in a fall at Doncaster.

Turner retired from race riding at the end of the 2015 season and became a regular contributor to ITV Racing. During her retirement she had retained her jockey's licence for occasional participation in international events, but received a three-month ban from the British Horseracing Authority in December 2017 for placing bets while licensed.
On completion of the ban in April 2018 Turner came out of retirement. Turner rode in France due to the female jockey weight allowance.

In June 2019, Turner achieved her first win at Royal Ascot when she took the Sandringham Handicap on 33/1 outsider Thanks Be. It was only the second time a female jockey had won at the meeting and 32 years since Gay Kelleway's win in 1987. Turner was given a nine-day suspension for her use of the whip on Thanks Be. The following year she won the same race again on another 33/1 outsider, Onassis.

Honours

Turner was appointed Officer of the Order of the British Empire (OBE) in the 2016 Birthday Honours for services to horse racing.

Personal life

Turner lives near Newmarket. She has coeliac disease and follows a gluten-free diet.

Winners per year

Per calendar year
2022: 37
2021: 48
2020: 20
2019: 28
2018: 45
2017: 16 (including 10 in France and 1 in Mauritius)
2016:  1
2015: 44
2014: 40
2013: 60
2012: 92
2011: 88 (injury ended season early)
2010: 73
2009: 60 (missed several months injured)
2008: 100
2007: 56
2006: 36
2005: 53
2004: 34 (including Apprentice Championship with 27 wins during Turf season)
2003: 14
2002: 9
2000: 1

Major wins 
 Great Britain
July Cup - (1) - Dream Ahead (2011)
Nunthorpe Stakes - (1) - Margot Did (2011)

 United States
 Beverly D. Stakes – (1) – I'm A Dreamer (2012)

References

1983 births
British female jockeys
Lester Award winners
Living people
People educated at Southwell Minster School
Sportspeople from Nottingham
Officers of the Order of the British Empire
British Champion apprentice jockeys
English jockeys